Horseley Fields Junction is a canal junction at the western limit of the Wyrley and Essington Canal where it meets the BCN Main Line, at Horseley Fields east of Wolverhampton, in the West Midlands, England.

History
The first canal into Birmingham was authorised by an Act of Parliament in 1768. It was designed by James Brindley and was a contour canal, weaving its way across the landscape in an attempt to stay on one level. It was to run from Gas Street Basin to Aldersley Junction, where it would join another of Brindley's Canals, the Staffordshire and Worcestershire Canal, which was under construction at the same time, and would link the Trent and Mersey Canal to the River Severn at Stourport on Severn. The line was finished through to Wednesbury, where there were coal mines, by 1769, and the link to Aldersley Junction, which included a flight of twenty locks, later increased by one, and passing through Horseley Fields, was completed in 1772. The Birmingham Canal company became the Birmingham Canal Navigations (BCN), following an amalgamation with the Birmingham and Fazeley Canal in 1794.

The Wyrley and Essington Canal was planned to serve the coal mines at Sneyd and Essington, bringing coal to the population of Wolverhampton and Walsall. It was authorised in 1792, and from Sneyd Junction, where the canal headed northwards to the collieries, the main line ran to the west to meet the Birmingham Canal at Horseley Fields, while a branch ran to the east to Birchills Junction, near Walsall. Construction started, but in 1794, the company obtained a second Act, which effectively made the Birchills Branch into the main line, and extended it to Ogley Junction, after which it descended through 30 locks to reach the Coventry Canal at Huddlesford Junction. The whole canal, including the junction at Horseley Fields, opened on 8 May 1797.

The Birmingham Canal Navigations approached the Wyrley and Essington in 1820, with a view to amalgamation, but the offer was refused. The reverse happened in 1838, but in 1840, they agreed. An informal agreement signed on 9 February 1840 was followed by an Act of Parliament to authorise the union in April. Horseley Junction became an internal junction between parts of the BCN system from that date, and its importance diminished a little, as three other junctions were created between the two canals in the years immediately after amalgamation.

Location
From the junction, the line to Aldersley Junction heads north-west, and is level for just  before the top lock of the 21-lock Wolverhampton flight is reached. The bottom lock is almost at the junction. The route is crossed by the A454 road at Horesley Fields Bridge immediately to the south of the junction. The only locks on this canal were the 30 that descended from Ogley Junction through Lichfield to Huddlesford Junction on the Coventry Canal. They were closed in 1954, but are the subject of an active restoration project, and that section has been renamed as the Lichfield Canal.

See also

Canals of the United Kingdom
History of the British canal system

Bibliography

References

Canal junctions in England
Transport in Wolverhampton
Birmingham Canal Navigations
Canals in the West Midlands (county)